Darlene J. Senger (born July 28, 1955) is an American politician. She was a member of the Naperville, Illinois City Council, where she served from 2002 to 2008, and was a Republican member of the Illinois House of Representatives from January 2009 to January 2015. In 2014, she unsuccessfully ran for Congress.

Senger is a legislative member of the American Legislative Exchange Council (ALEC). On August 7, 2017, it was announced that she would join the administration of Bruce Rauner as deputy chief of staff for legislative affairs, as part of a staff shake up that has seen multiple Illinois Policy Institute staffers join the Governor's administration.

Legislation
In 2011, Rep. Senger placed a measure requiring more strict regulation of abortion clinics before the Illinois House's Agriculture and Conservation Committee.  The measure passed the agricultural committee unanimously.

2014 Congressional campaign

Senger declared she would run for Illinois's 11th congressional district during the summer of 2013. She won a competitive Republican primary in March 2014 with 37% of the vote, defeating three other challengers. Senger then proceeded to the general election, where she would face Democratic incumbent Bill Foster. Foster defeated Senger 53.5%-46.5% in the general election on November 4, 2014.

References

External links
Representative Darlene Senger (R) 96th District at the Illinois General Assembly
Previous sessions: 97th, 96th

 

1955 births
DePaul University alumni
Illinois city council members
Living people
Republican Party members of the Illinois House of Representatives
Politicians from Naperville, Illinois
Purdue University alumni
Women city councillors in Illinois
Women state legislators in Illinois
21st-century American women